Darshita Shah is an Indian politician. She is a Member of the Gujarat Legislative Assembly from the Rajkot West Assembly constituency since December 8, 2022. She is Member of the Bharatiya Janata Party.

References 

Living people
Bharatiya Janata Party politicians from Gujarat
Gujarat MLAs 2022–2027
Year of birth missing (living people)
People from Rajkot district